
Gmina Raba Wyżna is a rural gmina (administrative district) in Nowy Targ County, Lesser Poland Voivodeship, in southern Poland.

Villages
Gmina Raba Wyżna contains the villages and settlements of Bielanka, Bukowina-Osiedle, Harkabuz, Podsarnie, Raba Wyżna, Rokiciny Podhalańskie, Sieniawa and Skawa.

Neighbouring gminas
Gmina Raba Wyżna is bordered by the town of Jordanów and by the gminas of Czarny Dunajec, Jabłonka, Jordanów, Lubień, Nowy Targ, Rabka-Zdrój and Spytkowice.

References
Polish official population figures 2006

Raba Wyzna
Nowy Targ County